Victor Montalvo (born May 1, 1994), also known mononymously as Victor, is an American breakdancer. He participated at the 2022 World Games in the dancesport competition where he won the gold medal in the B-Boys event.

References 

1994 births
Living people
Place of birth missing (living people)
American male dancers
American breakdancers
World Games gold medalists
Competitors at the 2022 World Games